Yulia Putintseva was the defending champion, but was defeated in the semifinals by Krunić.

Qualifier Bernarda Pera won her maiden WTA Tour title, defeating Aleksandra Krunić in the final, 6–3, 6–3. En route to the title, Pera neither dropped a set nor lost more than five games in any set.

Seeds

Draw

Finals

Top half

Bottom half

Qualifying

Seeds

Qualifiers

Lucky losers

Qualifying draw

First qualifier

Second qualifier

Third qualifier

Fourth qualifier

Fifth qualifier

Sixth qualifier

References 
 Main draw
 Qualifying draw

2022 Budapest Grand Prix - 1
2022 WTA Tour